Wiesemann is a surname. Notable people with the surname include:

Bernd Wiesemann (1938–2015), German pianist, composer, music educator and conceptual artist
Claudia Wiesemann (born 1958), German medical ethicist and medical historian
Karl-Heinz Wiesemann (born 1960), 96th Bishop of Speyer
Mirjam Wiesemann (born 1964), German actress and author